Achaearanea dubitabilis is a tangle web spider species found in the Canary Islands.

See also 
 List of Theridiidae species

References 

Theridiidae
Spiders of the Canary Islands
Spiders described in 1987